Breaking In is a 2018 American action thriller film directed by James McTeigue and starring Gabrielle Union, who also produced the film alongside Will Packer, James Lopez, Craig Perry, and Sheila Taylor. The film follows a mother who must protect her children after the mansion of her recently deceased father is invaded by burglars.

Principal photography began in July 2017 in Southern California. The film was released in the United States on May 11, 2018. It grossed over $51 million and received mixed reviews, with critics praising Union's performance but describing the film as having "thinly sketched characters and a slapdash plot."

Plot
After her father Isaac's murder, Shaun Russell travels with her two children, daughter Jasmine and son Glover, to the house where she grew up. Shaun intends to settle her father's estate and sell the remotely located house, which has multiple security features, including a hand-held remote monitor. When they arrive, the security system is offline, but Jasmine soon reactivates it.

Unknown to the family, four offenders – Peter, Sam, Duncan, and the crime boss Eddie – were in the house before them, burglarizing it. Then Jasmine and Glover are taken hostage while Shaun is locked outside and narrowly escapes an ambush from Peter. Duncan, the most violent and mentally unstable member of the group suggests torturing the children for the location of the safe but is objected by Eddie and Sam. Then another altercation sparks when Peter chases Shaun into the woods, where Peter gets knocked out by her. She leaves him bound and gagged, and uses the intercom to call the house. Eddie tells her they only came for the safe and the $4 million they know is inside; Isaac was under investigation by both the FBI and the District Attorney and Sam had learned that he liquidated his assets. The offenders have only 90 minutes from when they sever the phone lines before the security company contacts authorities, so they want to find it and leave quickly.

Concealed in the trees, Shaun sees Maggie, the realtor, arrive with paperwork for the house sale. Eddie greets her at the door, explaining Shaun had gone into town briefly, and attempts to invite her in. Maggie notices Shaun's purse on the table behind Eddie and knows something is wrong and politely declines. When Maggie turns her back on Eddie and leaves, Duncan ambushes her, and slits her throat, which outrages Eddie, as it means Shaun won't be as controllable.

Shaun eventually finds her way into the house, and gives instructions to Jasmine. When Eddie and Duncan next threaten the children, Jasmine leads them to the safe, which Shaun believes only Peter knows how to open. Shaun returns with Peter, a knife at his throat, demanding her family's release. Eddie shoots Peter dead, and Shaun flees back to the woods. Peter had a flash drive containing computer code on a necklace, which is all they needed to crack the safe. With all the money in a bag, Eddie now intends to burn the house down with the children in it to cover their escape, which Sam is uncomfortable with. Then Shaun creates a distraction by playing music with the portable hand-held security remote.

Duncan and Sam find Shaun on the roof during another rescue attempt. She hears a gunshot go off inside the house then jumps, pushing Sam off to his death, saving herself with the rope she tied to the roof. Then Shaun swipes Sam's truck keys sticking out of his pocket. Meanwhile, Jasmine frees herself and Glover, having cut through their bonds with a shard of glass from a broken lamp. The children escape the house and join their mother with Eddie in pursuit. Shaun uses Sam's truck to escape and mows down Duncan as they try to drive away, but Eddie blows out the truck tires, causing it to crash, foiling their escape.

Shaun and the kids lock themselves in the house, thinking it's all over, until they discover the bag of money is still inside. Shaun's husband Justin arrives unexpectedly and Eddie attacks him which convinces Shaun to unlock the door. He finds Shaun with the money bag, doused in gasoline and holding a lighter. Knowing that if he kills her, the lighter will ignite the bag, Eddie unloads his gun and Shaun lets him take the bag. However, Duncan appears and stabs Eddie to death to take the loot for himself, but instead of running away with the money, he goes after Shaun and threatens to rape her and Jasmine out of pure sadism. Jasmine arrives to help her mom, but Duncan overpowers her. He then prevents Shaun from taking his gun and demands if she has something to say to him, to which Shaun replies that he "broke into the wrong house", before swiping Duncan's knife from his pocket and using it to stab a stunned Duncan to death.

As police sirens and horns approach, Shaun goes outside to hold Justin and her kids close.

Cast
 Gabrielle Union as Shaun Russell
 Billy Burke as Eddie
 Richard Cabral as Duncan
 Ajiona Alexus as Jasmine Russell
 Levi Meaden as Sam
 Seth Carr as Glover Russell
 Mark Furze as Peter
 Jason George as Justin Russell
 Christa Miller as Maggie Harris
 Damien Leake as Isaac

Production
Principal photography on Breaking In began July 2017 in Los Angeles and Malibu, California.

Universal Pictures released the first official trailer for the film on January 11, 2018.

Reception

Box office
Breaking In grossed $46.5 million in the United States and Canada, and $4.5 million in other territories, for a worldwide total of $51.1 million, against a production budget of $6 million. In the United States and Canada, the film was released on May 11, 2018, alongside Life of the Party, and was projected to gross $14–17 million from 2,537 theaters in its opening weekend, with some pundits having it opening in the mid-$20 million range. It made $4.6 million on its first day, including $615,000 from Thursday night previews at 2,150 theaters. It went on to debut to $17.6 million, finishing third, behind Avengers: Infinity War ($62.1 million in its third week) and Life of the Party ($17.9 million); 68% of its audience was female while 73% was over the age of 25. It fell 61% in its second weekend to $6.8 million, finishing fifth at the box office, and another 41% to $4.1 million in its third, finishing sixth.

Critical response
The website's critical consensus reads, "Breaking In is proof that Gabrielle Union deserves more leading roles — particularly in films that offer more than this rote, disposable action thriller." On Metacritic, the film has a weighted average score of 42 out of 100, based on reviews from 24 critics, indicating "mixed or average reviews". Audiences polled by CinemaScore gave the film an average grade of "B" on an A+ to F scale.

References

External links
 
 
 

2018 action thriller films
American action thriller films
Home invasions in film
Films shot in Los Angeles
Films set in country houses
Films set in Malibu, California
Films set in Wisconsin
Films directed by James McTeigue
Films produced by Will Packer
Universal Pictures films
Will Packer Productions films
Films scored by Johnny Klimek
2010s English-language films
2010s American films